Robert Covington (born December 14, 1990) is an American professional basketball player for the Los Angeles Clippers of the National Basketball Association (NBA). he played college basketball for the Tennessee State Tigers. In 2018, he was named to the NBA All-Defensive First Team.

High school career
Covington attended Proviso West High School in Hillside, Illinois. As a senior in 2008–09, he averaged 18 points, 11 rebounds and 7 blocks per game as he was named the West Suburban Conference Player of the Year after leading Proviso West to the West Suburban Championship. He was also an All-Area and All-Conference first-team honoree.

College career
In his freshman season at Tennessee State, Covington was named to the Ohio Valley Conference All-Newcomer team and earned Mid-Major Freshman All-America honors from Collegeinsider.com. In 32 games (28 starts), he averaged 11.5 points, 6.5 rebounds, 1.2 assists, 1.1 steals and 1.1 blocks in 27.3 minutes per game.

In his sophomore season, Covington recorded eight double-doubles and was named OVC Player of the Week on December 27, 2010. He led the team in rebounds (7.5 rpg), field goal percentage (.500) and three-point field goal percentage (.460). He also led the OVC with his 46% three-point shooting as he earned second-team All-OVC and second-team NABC Division I All-District 19 honors. In 30 games (all starts), he averaged 13.3 points, 7.5 rebounds, 1.2 assists, 1.5 steals and 1.0 blocks in 30.8 minutes per game.

In his junior season, Covington earned first-team All-OVC and first-team NABC Division I All-District 19 honors, and was named the 2011–12 CollegeInsider.com OVC co-MVP. He also earned OVC All-Tournament team and Continental Tire Las Vegas Invitational All-Tournament team honors. At the season's end, he had 1,358 points and 693 rebounds, ranking for 16th and 13th in school history respectively. In 33 games (32 starts), he averaged 17.8 points, 7.9 rebounds, 1.3 assists, 1.5 steals and 1.4 blocks in 31.2 minutes per game.

In his senior season, Covington earned second-team All-OVC and second-team NABC Division I All-District 19 honors for the second time in his career despite missing ten games due to injury. In 23 games (22 starts), he averaged 17.0 points, 8.0 rebounds, 1.3 assists, 2.3 steals and 1.7 blocks in 31.0 minutes per game. He finished his career ranked seventh on Tennessee State's all-time list in both scoring and rebounding, with 1,749 points and 876 rebounds.

Professional career

Houston Rockets (2013–2014)

After going undrafted in the 2013 NBA draft, Covington joined the Houston Rockets for the 2013 NBA Summer League. On July 15, 2013, he signed a multi-year deal with the Rockets. He spent the majority of the 2013–14 season in the NBA Development League with the Rockets' affiliate team, the Rio Grande Valley Vipers, appearing in just seven NBA games. He participated in the 2014 NBA D-League All-Star Game in February, where scored an NBA D-League All-Star record 33 points, 22 of which came in the game's final six minutes, en route to earning MVP honors in the game. He connected on 12 of his 23 shots, including four-of-eight three-pointers at NBA All-Star festivities in New Orleans. In April, he was named the NBA D-League Rookie of the Year. He played in 42 of the Vipers 50 regular season games, 41 as a starter. He averaged a team-high 23.2 points, good for second best in the NBA D-League, while shooting 44 percent from the field. He also averaged 9.2 rebounds and 2.4 steals per game.

After spending Summer League, training camp and preseason with the Rockets, Covington was waived on October 27, 2014.

Covington was selected 3rd overall by the Grand Rapids Drive in the 2015 D-League Draft, however he never played for the team.

Philadelphia 76ers (2014–2018)
On November 15, 2014, Covington signed a reported five-year contract with the Philadelphia 76ers. He made his debut for the 76ers two days later, recording six points, three rebounds, two assists and two steals in 16½ minutes off the bench in a 100–75 loss to the San Antonio Spurs. On December 3, he scored a career-best 17 points in an 85–77 win over the Minnesota Timberwolves. Two nights later against the Oklahoma City Thunder, he set a new career high. In 28 minutes, he scored 21 points on 8-of-13 shooting and 3-of-6 from beyond the arc. A day later, he did it again, dropping 25 points on 9-of-14 shooting in 29 minutes off the bench in a 108–101 overtime victory over the Detroit Pistons. On March 25, he had a second 25-point effort against the Denver Nuggets. On April 8, Covington scored a career-high 27 points on 8-for-11 shooting in a 119–90 loss to the Washington Wizards. Five days later, he had a third 25-point effort against the Milwaukee Bucks.

After battling injury early in the 2015–16 season, Covington quickly began to excel, leading the NBA with 3.6 steals per game come December. In the final three games of November, Covington secured six-plus steals in each contest, making him the first NBA player to accomplish the feat in three-consecutive games since Alvin Robertson in 1986. On November 27, he recorded career highs of 28 points and eight steals in a 116–114 loss to the Houston Rockets. On December 1, he scored a game-high 23 points to help the 76ers defeat the Los Angeles Lakers 103–91 and end a 28-game losing streak that began on March 27, 2015, during the 2014–15 season. On February 10, he scored a career-high 29 points and hit a career-high seven three-pointers in a loss to the Sacramento Kings. He set a new career high for scoring on April 8 with 30 points against the New York Knicks. On April 12, in a loss to the Toronto Raptors, Covington had his seventh game of the season with six or more three-pointers, joining Stephen Curry, Klay Thompson and J. R. Smith as the only players to do so in 2015–16. In the team's season finale the following day, Covington scored 27 points and again hit six three-pointers in a 115–105 loss to the Chicago Bulls.

On December 14, 2016, Covington had season highs of 26 points and 12 rebounds in a 123–114 loss to the Raptors. On January 20, 2017, he scored 22 points and made two three-pointers in the final 40 seconds to lead the 76ers to a come-from-behind 93–92 win over the Portland Trail Blazers. On January 29, 2017, he scored 21 points and tied his season high of 12 rebounds in a 121–108 loss to the Bulls. In March 2017, he had 13 rebounds on three occasions. On March 31, he was ruled out for the rest of the season with right knee soreness and swelling.

In the 76ers' season opener on October 18, 2017, Covington scored 29 points in a 120–115 loss to the Wizards. On November 13, he scored a season-high 31 points against the Los Angeles Clippers. On November 17, after restructuring the terms of his contract for the 2017–18 season, he signed a four-year, $62 million contract extension with the 76ers. In May 2018, he was named to the NBA All-Defensive First Team.

Covington started the first 13 games for the 76ers to begin the 2018–19 season.

Minnesota Timberwolves (2018–2020)
On November 12, 2018, Covington was traded to the Minnesota Timberwolves, along with Jerryd Bayless, Dario Šarić and a 2022 second-round pick, in exchange for Jimmy Butler and Justin Patton. He made his debut for the Timberwolves two days later, recording 13 points and seven rebounds in a 107–100 win over the New Orleans Pelicans. On December 31, late in the Timberwolves' loss to the New Orleans Pelicans, Covington sustained a bone bruise on his right knee. After missing 23 games, he was assigned to the Iowa Wolves of the NBA G League on February 27. On March 21, after suffering a setback in his quest for a return, Covington was ruled out for the rest of the season. He underwent successful arthroscopic surgery on April 1.

Return to Houston (2020)
On February 5, 2020, Covington returned to the Rockets in a four-team, 12-player trade with Jordan Bell from the Timberwolves; Minnesota received Jarred Vanderbilt, Malik Beasley, Juan Hernangómez, Evan Turner, and a 2020 first-round draft pick. The following day, Covington made his debut in a 121–111 win over the Los Angeles Lakers, scoring 14 points along with eight rebounds in 30 minutes. On February 29, in a 111–110 overtime win over the Boston Celtics, Covington had 16 points, 16 rebounds, and 3 blocks.

Portland Trail Blazers (2020–2022)
On November 22, 2020, Covington was traded to the Portland Trail Blazers in exchange for Trevor Ariza, the draft rights to Isaiah Stewart and a conditional future first-round pick.

Los Angeles Clippers (2022–present)
On February 4, 2022, Covington was traded, alongside Norman Powell, to the Los Angeles Clippers in exchange for Eric Bledsoe, Keon Johnson, Justise Winslow, and a 2025 second-round pick. On April 1, Covington logged a career-high 43 points, along with eight rebounds and three blocks, in a 153–119 blowout win over the Milwaukee Bucks. He also made 11 three-pointers during the game, setting a Clippers franchise record for most three-pointers made in a game. On May 8, Covington signed a two-year, $24 million extension with the Clippers.

Career statistics

NBA

Regular season

|-
| style="text-align:left;"|
| style="text-align:left;"|Houston
| 7 || 0 || 4.9 || .429 || .364 ||  || .7 || .0 || .3 || .0 || 2.3
|-
| style="text-align:left;"|
| style="text-align:left;"|Philadelphia
| 70|| 49 || 27.9 || .396 || .374 || .820 || 4.5 || 1.5 || 1.4 || .4 || 13.5
|-
| style="text-align:left;"|
| style="text-align:left;"|Philadelphia
| 67 || 49 || 28.4 || .385 || .353 || .791 || 6.3 || 1.4 || 1.6 || .6 || 12.8
|-
| style="text-align:left;"|
| style="text-align:left;"|Philadelphia
| 67 || 67 || 31.6 || .399 || .333 || .822 || 6.5 || 1.5 || 1.9 || 1.0 || 12.9
|-
| style="text-align:left;"|
| style="text-align:left;"|Philadelphia
| 80 || 80 || 31.7 || .413 || .369 || .853 || 5.4 || 2.0 || 1.7 || .9 || 12.6
|-
|rowspan=2 style="text-align:left;"|
| style="text-align:left;"|Philadelphia
| 13 || 13 || 33.8 || .427 || .390 || .739 || 5.2 || 1.1 || 1.8 || 1.8 || 11.3
|-
| style="text-align:left;"|Minnesota
| 22 || 22 || 34.7 || .433 || .372 || .773 || 5.7 || 1.5 || 2.3 || 1.1 || 14.5
|-
|rowspan=2 style="text-align:left;"|
| style="text-align:left;"|Minnesota
| 48 || 47 || 29.4 || .435 || .346 || .798 || 6.0 || 1.2 || 1.7 || .9 || 12.8
|-
| style="text-align:left;"|Houston
| 22 || 21 || 33.0 || .392 || .315 || .800 || 8.0 || 1.5 || 1.6 || 2.2 || 11.6 
|-
| style="text-align:left;"|
| style="text-align:left;"|Portland
| 70 || 70 || 32.0 || .401 || .379 || .806 || 6.7 || 1.7 || 1.4 || 1.2 || 8.5
|-
| style="text-align:left;"rowspan=2|
| style="text-align:left;"|Portland
| 48 || 40 || 29.8 || .381 || .343 || .833 || 5.7 || 1.4 || 1.5 || 1.3 || 7.6
|-
| style="text-align:left;"|L.A. Clippers
| 23 || 2 || 22.1 || .500 || .450 || .848 || 5.1 || 1.0 || 1.3 || 1.2 || 10.4
|- class="sortbottom"
| style="text-align:center;" colspan="2"|Career
| 537 || 460 || 29.9 || .406 || .360 || .813 || 5.8 || 1.5 || 1.6 || 1.0 || 11.6

Playoffs

|-
| style="text-align:left;"|2018
| style="text-align:left;"|Philadelphia
| 10 || 8 || 28.1 || .325 || .313 || .750 || 5.3 || 2.5 || 1.1 || .9 || 8.1
|-
| style="text-align:left;"|2020
| style="text-align:left;"|Houston
| 12 || 12 || 31.6 || .495 || .500 || .857 || 5.0 || 1.3 || 2.5 || 1.1 || 11.2 
|-
| style="text-align:left;"|2021
| style="text-align:left;"|Portland
| 6 || 6 || 38.0 || .500 || .500 || .900 || 7.8 || 1.2 || 1.5 || 1.1 || 9.3
|- class"sortbottom"
| style="text-align:center;" colspan="2"|Career
| 28 || 26 || 31.7 || .430 || .435 || .818 || 5.7 || 1.7 || 1.8 || 1.0 || 9.7

College

|-
| style="text-align:left;"|2009–10
| style="text-align:left;"|Tennessee State
| 32 || 28 || 27.3 || .428 || .385 || .797 || 6.5 || 1.2 || 1.1 || 1.1 || 11.5
|-
| style="text-align:left;"|2010–11
| style="text-align:left;"|Tennessee State
| 30 || 30 || 30.8 || .498 || .460 || .782 || 7.5 || 1.2 || 1.5 || 1.0 || 13.3
|-
| style="text-align:left;"|2011–12
| style="text-align:left;"|Tennessee State
| 33 || 32 || 31.2 || .526 || .448 || .775 || 7.9 || 1.3 || 1.5 || 1.4 || 17.8
|-
| style="text-align:left;"|2012–13
| style="text-align:left;"|Tennessee State
| 23 || 21 || 31.0 || .435 || .388 || .850 || 8.0 || 1.3 || 2.2 || 1.7 || 17.0
|- class="sortbottom"
| style="text-align:center;" colspan="2"|Career
| 118 || 111 || 30.0 || .476 || .422 || .802 || 7.4 || 1.2 || 1.5 || 1.3 || 14.8

Personal life
Covington is the son of Dennis and Teresa Bryant. Covington is in a relationship with model Amirah Dyme. As of March 2022, the couple are expecting their first child.

Awards and achievements
NBA Awards:
NBA All-Defensive First Team

NBA G League Awards:
NBA G League All-Star
NBA G League All-Star Game MVP
All-NBA G League First Team
NBA G League Rookie of the Year

References

External links

 Robert Covington: If You Don't Know, Now You Know
 NBA G League profile
 Tennessee State Tigers bio
 
 

1990 births
Living people
21st-century African-American sportspeople
African-American basketball players
American men's basketball players
Basketball players from Illinois
Houston Rockets players
Los Angeles Clippers players
Minnesota Timberwolves players
People from Bellwood, Illinois
Philadelphia 76ers players
Portland Trail Blazers players
Rio Grande Valley Vipers players
Shooting guards
Small forwards
Sportspeople from Cook County, Illinois
Tennessee State Tigers basketball players
Undrafted National Basketball Association players